Ted Drews (December 15, 1902 – April 15, 1982) was an American football player who played wide receiver for two seasons for the Chicago Bears and Brooklyn Lions.

References

1902 births
American football wide receivers
Chicago Bears players
Brooklyn Lions players
Princeton Tigers football players
1982 deaths